Jill Pauline Oakes (born July 18, 1984) is an American retired soccer defender who last played for Chicago Red Stars of Women's Professional Soccer.

Oakes was originally drafted by FC Gold Pride 2nd overall in the 2008 WPS General Draft.  She was unable to make the Pride's final roster and was cut before she ever made a regular season appearance for the club.  She was subsequently signed by Chicago Red Stars for the 2009 season.

She is married to former UCLA Bruin, and former Sacramento Kings point guard Jordan Farmar since July 29, 2012.

References

External links

US National Team player profile
Chicago Red Stars player profile
New Jersey Wildcats player profile
W-League player profile
UCLA player profile

UCLA Bruins women's soccer players
American women's soccer players
Chicago Red Stars players
Pali Blues players
Vancouver Whitecaps FC (women) players
USL W-League (1995–2015) players
1984 births
Living people
People from Tarzana, Los Angeles
Women's association football midfielders
Damallsvenskan players
United States women's international soccer players
Women's Professional Soccer players